The 1949 AAA Championship Car season consisted of 14 races, beginning in Arlington, Texas on April 24 and concluding in Del Mar, California on November 6.  There were also two non-championship events.  The AAA National Champion was Johnnie Parsons, and the Indianapolis 500 winner was Bill Holland. The season was marred by George Metzler's death at Indianapolis in practice, Bill Sheffler's death at Trenton also in practice, and Rex Mays's death in the final race at Del Mar.

Schedule and results

  No pole is awarded for the Pikes Peak Hill Climb, in this schedule on the pole is the driver who started first. No lap led was awarded for the Pikes Peak Hill Climb, however, a lap was awarded to the drivers that completed the climb.

Final points standings

Note: The points became the car, when not only one driver led the car, the relieved driver became small part of the points. Points for driver method: (the points for the finish place) / (number the lap when completed the car) * (number the lap when completed the driver)

References
 
 
 
 http://media.indycar.com/pdf/2011/IICS_2011_Historical_Record_Book_INT6.pdf  (p. 306-309)

See also
 1949 Indianapolis 500

AAA Championship Car
1949 in American motorsport